Sembadavar  or Parvatha Rajakulam is a traditional fisherman community found mainly on the Coromandel coast of the Indian states of Tamil Nadu and Pondicherry. They also take the title Nattar. Sembadavar are a maritime community who are occupied primarily as inland and river fishermen and primarily fish with fishing net. A similar caste also known as Sambuni Reddi is found in Andhra Pradesh and Telangana. There are many theories as to their origins but they have since ancient times been recorded in the area of Tamil Nadu, Pondicherry and Sri Lanka.

Etymology 
The name Sembadavar is mythologically connected to the principal Hindu god Shiva. The name is derived from the Tamil words Sambu, a name of Shiva and Padavar meaning boatmen thus literally meaning "Shiva's boatmen". The name might also be derived from Sem meaning good and Padavar thus literally meaning "good boatmen".

History

Mythological origin 
According to one legend was Shiva fond of one of their chief deity Ankalamman. Out of the union was Parvatha Rajan (king of the Parvata Kingdom) born who disguised himself as a boatman. His boat was made of copper, the Vedas assumed the form of his fishing net and the Rakshasas took the form of the pisces. Accidentally was a rishi caught in his net, who angered called Parvatha Rajan a "Sembu Padavar" meaning "copper boatmen" and cursed his descendants to become fishermen. From this myth do they call themselves as Sembadavar or also Parvatha Rajakulam (meaning descendant of Parvatha Raja).

Post-independence
In 1947, the fisheries became a monopoly of the new independent Indian government.

, Parvatharajakulam is classified as a Most backward caste by the Governments of Tamil Nadu and Pondicherry.

References

External links
 List of Backward Classes  approved by Government of Tamil Nadu
 Latest updated list of OBCS notified by the UT of Puducherry
 Central list of OBCS for the UT of Puducherry
 Central list of other Backward classes

Tamil society
Indian castes
Sri Lankan Tamil society
Social groups of Tamil Nadu
Converts to Christianity
Fishing castes